The Statute Law Revision Act 1871 (34 & 35 Vict c 116) is an Act of the Parliament of the United Kingdom.

It was intended, in particular, to facilitate the preparation of the revised edition of the statutes then in progress.

This Act was partly in force in Great Britain at the end of 2010.

The enactments which were repealed (whether for the whole or any part of the United Kingdom) by this Act were repealed so far as they extended to the Isle of Man on 25 July 1991.

Section 2 of the Statute Law Revision Act 1872 (35 & 36 Vict c 63) provided that the explanatory note of the Schedule to this Act shall be read as if the words "Edward the Third" were inserted immediately before the words "William the Third".

The Schedule to this Act was repealed by section 1 of, and Schedule 1 to, the Statute Law Revision Act 1894.

This Act was retained for the Republic of Ireland by section 2(2)(a) of, and Part 4 of Schedule 1 to, the Statute Law Revision Act 2007.

See also
Statute Law Revision Act

References
Halsbury's Statutes,
The Public General Statutes passed in the Thirty-fourth and Thirty-fifth Years of the Reign of Her Majesty Queen Victoria, 1871. Queen's Printer. East Harding Street, London. 1871. Pages 638 et seq. Digistised copy from Google Books.

External links
List of amendments and repeals in the Republic of Ireland from the Irish Statute Book
  ["Note" and "Schedule" of the bill (unlike the schedule of the act as passed) gives commentary on each scheduled act, noting any earlier repeals and the reason for the new repeal]

United Kingdom Acts of Parliament 1871